William O'Leary (born October 19, 1957) is an American actor. He is best known for Marty Taylor on Home Improvement (1994-1999).

Early life
He was born in Chicago, Illinois and started acting at the age of 7. He graduated from Highland Park High School in Highland Park, Illinois, in 1976.

O'Leary received a degree in acting from Illinois State University and in 1982 received an MFA from the University of Washington's Professional Actor Training Program.

Career
O'Leary made his Broadway debut in 1986 alongside Ed Harris and Judith Ivey as Art in Precious Sons at the Longacre Theatre.

He played Marty Taylor, the younger brother of Tim Taylor (Tim Allen), on Home Improvement, and was the primary antagonist, General Xaviax, on Kamen Rider: Dragon Knight.

Filmography

References

External links

1957 births
Living people
American male film actors
American male stage actors
American male television actors
Male actors from Chicago
University of Washington School of Drama alumni
20th-century American male actors
21st-century American male actors